Ashireh Sar (also Romanized as ʿAshīreh Sar) is a village in Siyahrud Rural District, in the Central District of Juybar County, Mazandaran Province, Iran. At the 2006 census, its population was 95, in 26 families.

References 

Populated places in Juybar County